Daulat Qazi was a medieval Bengali poet, was born into a Qazi family in the village of Sultanpur in Raozan Upazila, Chittagong. Not getting any recognition at home, he left for Arakan, where he seems to have been received warmly.

Life and work
Qazi is believed to the first Bengali poet to write under the patronage of the Arakan court. His patron Ashraf Khan was a commanding officer of King Thiri Thudhamma, who ruled from 1622 to 1638. There is evidence in his poem, that both Khan and Qazi were Sufis. Ashraf Khan asked Daulat to render the Avadhi narratives of Lor, Chandrani and Mayana into Bengali. Daulat Qazi died before he could finish his work. It was completed years later by Alaol.

Notes

1600s births
1638 deaths
People from Chittagong District
17th-century Bengalis
Bengali writers
Bengali poets
Bengali-language poets
Bengali-language writers
17th-century Bengali poets
Date of birth unknown
Bengali male poets
17th-century Indian poets

Bengali Muslims